The North Sea Transition Authority (NSTA), known as the Oil and Gas Authority (OGA) until March 2022, is a private company limited by shares wholly owned by the Secretary of State for Business, Energy and Industrial Strategy. It is responsible for maximising the economic recovery of oil from the North Sea. It is empowered to license and regulate activity in relation to oil and gas in the United Kingdom, including oil and gas exploration, carbon capture and storage, and offshore gas storage. 

The NSTA’s role is to take the steps necessary to:

Established in April 2015 as an executive agency of the Department for Business, Energy and Industrial Strategy, on 1 October 2016 the Oil and Gas Authority was incorporated as a Government Company, with the Secretary of State for Business, Energy and Industrial Strategy the sole shareholder and headquartered in Aberdeen with another office in London, which is also its registered company address. As of the 6 March 2019, Tim Eggar is the chair.

History 
In June 2013, the UK government asked Sir Ian Wood of Wood Group to conduct a review into maximising the recovery of oil and gas from the UK Continental Shelf. One of the recommendations of the Wood Review was the creation of an independent economic regulator for the sector. Subsequently the OGA was launched on 1 April 2015 as an executive agency of the Department of Energy and Climate Change. The Energy Act 2016, which received Royal Assent in May 2016, created the legislative framework to formally establish the OGA as a government company, limited by shares under the Companies Act 2006, with the Secretary of State for Business, Energy and Industrial Strategy the sole shareholder. The Energy Act 2016 also provided the OGA with new regulatory powers, including the ability to participate in meetings with operators, to have access to data, provide dispute resolution and introduce a range of sanctions such as enforcement notices and fines of up to £1 million. On the 6 March 2019, Frances Morris-Jones was replaced by Tim Eggar as the chairman of the authority.

Fracking 
On 1 November 2019, following a report from the Oil and Gas Authority, the government called a halt to all fracking in the UK "with immediate effect" and warned shale gas companies that it would not support future projects.

Corporate information

Name 
On 1 July 2015, Oil and Gas Authority Limited was incorporated as a private limited company in England and Wales under the Companies Act 2006, although following incorporation it remained dormant for financial year 2015-2016. Pursuant to the Energy Act 2016, Oil and Gas Authority Limited was renamed Oil and Gas Authority on 12 July 2016. Under the Companies Act 2006, private limited companies are required to include the word "limited" in their names unless exempted; the Energy Act 2016 provided for such an exemption, which came into force on 12 July 2016. 

On 21 March 2022, the Oil and Gas Authority adopted the trading name of North Sea Transition Authority, although its legal name remains unchanged. In a House of Commons debate on 29 March 2022, Caroline Lucas accused the government of greenwashing over the change of name. Following this, on 31 March 2022, Greg Hands, Minister for Energy, Clean Growth and Climate Change, said in a written statement to the House of Commons that "[t]he new name better represents the breadth of work it now undertakes and its pivotal role in supporting the UK upstream oil and gas industry to achieve net zero emissions."

Functions, powers, and property 
Under Part 1 of the Energy Act 2016, function, powers, and property of the Secretary of State for Business, Energy and Industrial Strategy may be transferred to the Oil and Gas Authority by way of statutory instrument.

Personnel 
Part 1 of the Energy Act also provides for the Secretary of State to transfer staff working for the Department for Business, Energy and Industrial Strategy to the Oil and Gas Authority. Since 2015, Andy Samuel has been chief executive, and since 2019 Tim Eggar has been chairman of the board.

In September 2021 Greenpeace reported that eight of the OGA's 13 board members and senior managers previously worked in the industry, and three held sizeable shareholdings in oil firms. The OGA said their knowledge was vital in helping to regulate the sector.

Ownership 
Oil and Gas Authority has one ordinary share, which since 2016 has been owned by the Secretary of State for Business, Energy and Industrial Strategy. Every subsequent confirmation statement has shown no shareholder changes.

Notes

References

External links
 Official website
 Wood Review website

Department of Energy and Climate Change
Executive agencies of the United Kingdom government
Regulators of the United Kingdom
Energy regulatory authorities
Department for Business, Energy and Industrial Strategy